The first season of The Great Canadian Baking Show premiered on CBC Television on November 1, 2017. Ten amateur bakers competed over eight weeks of challenges throughout the competition for the title.

This season was hosted by Canadian actor and television personality Dan Levy and British actress Julia Chan. The judging panel consisted of French chef Bruno Feldeisen, a multiple James Beard Award nominee and the former executive pastry chef for Four Seasons Hotels in New York and Vancouver, and Canadian-Australian pastry chef Rochelle Adonis, the European-trained creator of an eponymous high tea salon and confectionery brand in Australia.

After eight weeks of competition, Sabrina Degni was crowned the winner with Vandana Jain and Linda Longson as runners-up.

Bakers

Results summary

Episodes

Episode 1: Cake 
For the signature challenge, the bakers were given two hours to make 24 cupcakes with two different types of flavours. The technical challenge was to create a cherry and pistachio Battenberg cake – a recipe handpicked by Rochelle – with the marzipan, fondant, and jam provided to them. The bakers had an hour and 45 minutes to complete the cake, making sure to expose the ends of the cake as traditionally presented. For the showstopper, the bakers had four hours to make a chocolate layer cake with at least two layers and at least two different kinds of chocolate.

Episode 2: Bread 
For the signature challenge, the bakers were given two hours and 30 minutes to make a flavourful focaccia in whatever shape they chose. The technical challenge was to bake one dozen Montreal bagels: six with poppy seeds and six with sesame seeds. The bakers had two hours and 10 minutes to complete the bagels, ensuring they were properly poached in honey water to achieve subtle sweetness and the balance of a crispy crust and chewy centre. For the showstopper, the bakers had four hours to make a bread-based centrepiece with one or more sweet fillings.

Episode 3: Dessert 
For the signature challenge, the bakers were given two hours to make a sweet pie or tart. The technical challenge was to bake one dozen Fondant Fancies, small sponge cake squares glazed with butter cream and then drizzled in fondant. The bakers had two hours to complete the fancies, ensuring they were all equally square and properly coated in fondant. For the showstopper, the bakers had three hours to make a pavlova.

Episode 4: Canadian 
For the signature challenge, the bakers were given two hours to bake a tourtière. They were allowed to fill the pie with whatever they wanted, but had to also make a condiment to complement the pie. In the technical, the bakers were given one hour and forty-five minutes to make sixteen maple leaf cream cookies. The showstopper challenge was to make twelve doughnuts – six in one flavour and six in another – in three hours.

Episode 5: Best of Britain 
For the Best of Britain Signature challenge, the bakers had 2 hours to create a trifle, making sure that there were clearly defined layers of sponge cake, custard, cream, fresh fruit and jelly, along with a boozy element to the dish. In the Technical challenge, the bakers were given an hour and a half to create 20 brandy snaps, a popular British snack consisting of a thin, sugary biscuit rolled into a cylinder and filled with whipped cream. For the Showstopper challenge, the bakers had 4 hours to create a high tea platter. The bakers needed to create at least 3 different bakes, totalling 18 items on the platter, they needed to be an assortment of sweet and savoury delights, and there needed to be an overall theme to the high tea platter.

Episode 6: Holiday Baking 
For the first ever Holiday-themed week in the tent, the bakers had two and a half hours to create a bûche de Noël, a Christmas cake traditionally served in French-speaking countries. The bakers had 1 hour and 45 minutes to create 32 rugelach, a Jewish crescent-shaped filled pastry product traditionally enjoyed around Hanukkah; the bakers had to fill half of them with apricot jam and the other half with chocolate. For the Showstopper challenge, the bakers had 4 and a half hours to create an elaborate gingerbread structure.

Episode 7: French Pâtisserie 
In the semi-final Signature challenge, the bakers had two hours to create 12 mille-feuille. The pastries had to be in two different flavours, have at three different layers of puff pastry, and a complementary filling. The semi-final Technical, set by Bruno, saw the bakers make an Opera cake - a dessert made of almond joconde sponge soaked in coffee syrup, layered with chocolate buttercream and ganache, topped with a chocolate glaze, along with the word "Opera" elegantly piped in chocolate on top - in two hours 15 minutes. For the penultimate Showstopper challenge, the bakers were given four hours to create a croquembouche, a pastry tower consisting of cream-filled choux pastry puffs bound in spun sugar. The bakers were given free range with flavour and decoration of their creation.

Episode 8: Finale 
For the final Signature challenge, the bakers had 2 and a half hours to create 24 mini mousse cakes, which had to be in two different varieties. The final Technical challenge, set by Bruno, saw the judges ask the bakers to create a pear charlotte in 2 hours 20 minutes; the various components in creating the cake featured techniques that the judges felt the finalists struggled with in the past seven weeks. For their very last Showstopper (and the final challenge of the season), the three finalists had to create a wedding cake that was at least three tiers high in four hours' time.

References 

1
2017 Canadian television seasons